Tranmere Rovers F.C. played the 1924–25 season in the Football League Third Division North. It was their fourth season of league football, and they finished 21st of 22. They reached the Fifth Qualifying Round of the FA Cup.

Football League

References 

Tranmere Rovers F.C. seasons